Sunny is a daytime weather condition. It may refer to:

People 
 Sunny (name), including a list of people and characters with the name
 Sunny (singer), member of Girls' Generation
 Sunny, of Sue and Sunny, who also recorded as a solo artist

Music 
 Sunny (musical), a 1925 Jerome Kern musical
 Sunny (Neil Sedaka album), 1979
 Sunny (Towa Tei album), 2011
 "Sunny" (Bobby Hebb song), a 1966 song by Bobby Hebb, covered by Boney M., José Feliciano and Cher
 "Sunny" (Morrissey song), a 1995 song by Morrissey
 "Sunny", a song by Brockhampton from Saturation II
 "Sunny", a song by Stereophonics on their 2015 album Keep the Village Alive

Films 
 Sunny (1930 film), a film adaptation of the musical
 Sunny (1941 film), a film adaptation of the musical
 Sunny (1984 film), an Indian film directed by Anil Joshi
 Sunny (2008 film), a South Korean film about South Korean entertainers in the Vietnam War
 Sunny (2011 film), a South Korean film about a group of old high school friends
 Sunny (2021 film), an Indian Malayalam-language film directed by Ranjith Sankar

Radio stations 
 KODA (Sunny 99.1), in Houston, Texas
 KSNE-FM (Sunny 106.5), in Las Vegas, Nevada
 KTSM-FM (Sunny 99.9), in El Paso, Texas
 Sunny (XM), XM Satellite Radio channel 24
 WEAT (Sunny 107.9), in West Palm Beach, Florida, formerly on 104.3 FM as Sunny 104.3
 WOCL (105.9 Sunny FM), in Orlando, Florida, formerly known as Sunny 105.9
 WSNY (94.7 known as "Sunny 95"), in Columbus, Ohio
 Formerly known as WSOS-FM (Sunny 94.1), in Jacksonville, Florida, which is now Classic Rock 94.1

Vehicles 
 Nissan Sunny, a vehicle
 , an Indonesian cargo ship in service 1959–69
 Airkraft Sunny, a Swiss ultralight aircraft

Other uses
 Sunny (dog), the pet dog of the Obama family
 Sunny (manga), a slice of life manga series by Taiyō Matsumoto
 Sunny Optical, or known as just "Sunny", Chinese listed manufacturer of optical lens
 Bluegill, a species of fish also known as a "Sunny"

See also 
 
 Seiyu Group, a Japanese supermarket
 Sonny (disambiguation)
 Sunni Islam, the largest branch of Islam, comprising up to ninety percent of the world's Muslim population